Vince Spadea was the defending champion, but he was eliminated by qualifier Luka Gregorc already in the first round.
Donald Young defeated his compatriot Michael Russell 7–6(4), 6–1 in the final.

Seeds

Draw

Finals

Top half

Bottom half

References
 Main Draw
 Qualifying Draw

2009 ATP Challenger Tour
2009,Singles